Tsambyn Danzan (born 29 January 1945) is a Mongolian biathlete. He competed in the 20 km individual event at the 1964 Winter Olympics.

References

1945 births
Living people
Mongolian male biathletes
Olympic biathletes of Mongolia
Biathletes at the 1964 Winter Olympics
Place of birth missing (living people)
20th-century Mongolian people